Woman with Umbrella in Front of a Hat Shop is an oil on canvas painting by the German painter August Macke, executed in 1914. It depicts a woman peeking into a hat shop, painted in an Expressionist style. The painting is in the collection of the Museum Folkwang in Essen.

History
Macke moved with his wife Elisabeth to Hilterfingen, on the Lake Thun, in Switzerland, in November 1913, where his mother-in-law had a house. The small, orderly bourgeois town inspired him to create a series of quiet, subdued compositions. In particular, he became particularly interested by hat shop windows, which he would frequently make the theme of his paintings. Clearly visible in these works is a focus on subjects from everyday life and the passing moment, as was also known from the Impressionists. Although the formalizing abstraction creates a certain detachment, his works from this period, going until to April 1914, nevertheless radiate a striking positivity.

Description
This is regarded as the most mature of Macke's shop window paintings. It arose immediately after Zwei Frauen vor dem Hutladen and also builds on it. Theme and atmosphere are similar, typically urban, but anything but loud and hectic. The female figure, dressed in an elegant suit, wearing a hat with a white bouquet on her head and an umbrella over her shoulder, could have been taken right out of that earlier work. The lady has no face and remains anonymous, like she was a fashion doll.

Compositionally, Macke has clearly arranged the image space, based on clear diagonal perspective lines. The plane-disintegrating geometric shape of the stone facade with the carved pilasters and the shop window, as well as the abstracted figure, fit into the structure of the painting like mosaic stones and form an integrated unit. This also applies to the use of color, with deliberately chosen accents around the middle. The woman's clothing, predominantly warm reds and yellows, corresponds to the hats in the shop window on stands, which are decorated with ribbons and feathers. The light breaks in the window. Reflections mix both inside and outside with the spaces and surfaces. The transparent surfaces in the shop window are echoed in the rustic pilaster on the side.

The attraction of the work lies mainly in the clear and firm power of the composition and the radiant expressive power of the contrasting colours. The atmospheric figurative description of the situation is naturally mixed with a cool abstract effect, giving the painting a special classical-modern tension.

Woman with Umbrella in Front of a Hat Shop was purchased in 1920 by the Museum Folkwang, in Essen, then called Essener Kunstmuseum. In 1937 it was confiscated by the Nazis as degenerate art, but in 1953 the work was bought back by the museum, with the support of the city of Essen. It is now regarded as one of her top works in the collection of modern German art.

See also
List of works by August Macke

References

External links

1914 paintings
Paintings by August Macke
Collection of the Museum Folkwang
Paintings of women